Shurabad-e Fandaq (also Romanized as Shūrābād-e Fandaq; also known as Shūrābād) is a village in Gowhar Kuh Rural District, Nukabad District, Khash County, Sistan and Baluchestan Province, Iran. At the 2006 census, its population was 47, in 7 families.

References 

Populated places in Khash County